Hebbet Ramakka is a 2018 Indian Kannada political drama film written and directed by N. R. Nanjundegowda and produced by S. A. Puttaraju. The film stars Tara in the lead protagonist role along with Devaraj. The score and soundtrack for the film is by Poornachandra Tejaswi.

At the 65th National Film Awards, the film won the Best Feature Film in Kannada award. The film made its theatrical release on 27 April 2018.

Cast
 Tara as Ramakka
 Devaraj as Kalleshanna, Ramakka's husband
 Nagaraj Murthy
 Kappanna
 Hiral
 Hanumanthegowda

Soundtrack

The film's background score and the soundtracks are composed by Poornachandra Tejaswi. The music rights were acquired by Ananda Audio.

References

External links
  
  Hebbet Ramakka (U) (2018)

2010s Kannada-language films
Indian political films
Indian political drama films
Films shot in Bangalore
Best Kannada Feature Film National Film Award winners